Temeke District (officially known as Temeke Municipal Council ) is one of five district in Dar es Salaam, Tanzania, with Kinondoni to the far north of the city, and Ilala in the downtown of Dar es Salaam. To the east is the Indian Ocean and to the south and west is the coastal region of Tanzania. The 2012 Tanzania National Census reported that the population of Temeke District was 1,368,881. The area is 729 km2.

Wards 
Temeke District is administratively divided into  21 wards. The wards are:

 Azimio
 Buza, Temeke
 Chamazi
 Chang'ombe
 Charambe
 Keko
 Kiburugwa
 Kijichi
 Kilakala
 Kurasini
 Makangarawe
 Mbagala
 Mbagala Kuu
 Mianzini
 Miburani
 Mtoni
 Sandali
 Tandika
 Temeke
 Toangoma
 Yombo Vituka

Sources
Temeke District homepage for the 2002 Tanzania National Census

References 

 
Dar es Salaam
Districts of Dar es Salaam Region
Populated places in Dar es Salaam Region